Singer 2018 is the sixth season of Chinese television series Singer, a rebranded version of I Am a Singer that aired on Hunan Television. It is produced by Hong Tao, and its music director is Hong Kong senior musician Kubert Leung. The first episode was recorded in the Hunan Broadcasting System Radio and Television Center, Changsha, Hunan on December 28, 2017 and premiered on January 12, 2018 and ended on April 20, 2018. For the first time this series, YouTube provided English captions for the show.

On April 13, 2018, British singer Jessie J was declared winner of Singer 2018, and J was the first non-Chinese and foreign singer to win I Am a Singer. Chinese singers Hua Chenyu and Wang Feng were placed second and third, respectively.

Competition rules 
As like the previous seasons of I Am a Singer and Singer 2017, Singer 2018 was divided into four rounds of three stages, and seven singers performed for a 500-member audience each week. Similar to the previous series, the total votes cast from both Qualifiers and Knockouts determined which singer was eliminated from the competition.

This series features a modification to the Challenge rounds, with the Challenger entering the competition starting at the Knockout rounds instead of Challenge round (where a new substitute singer would enter the competition instead). Challengers must avoid last place on their first week in addition to finishing in the top four on the second week (in a combination of both knockout and challenge rounds) to be declared safe; failing either challenge instantly eliminates the singer from the competition.

A new pre-voting introduced in the season, Pre-Audience Voting, replaces the Singer Voting which debuted in season 3. Midway after the fourth performance, the audience were asked to make early predictions on which three singers would receive the most votes after the remaining performances of that episode. Similar to Singer Voting, Pre-audience voting has no impact onto the outcome of the competition (with one exception, see below) and does not count towards the audience's vote count. 

The announcement of results was also changed, with only the results for the top four revealed during the Qualifiers, while the remaining results (bottom three) would not be revealed until the Knockouts; in most cases, they could choose their performance order by ballot for the next night.

Contestants
The following Singer 2018 contestants are listed in alphabetical order (singers without a placement for the final is listed as finalist; singers eliminated before the finals are listed as non-finalist; singers withdrew were listed as withdrawn):

Key:
 – Winner
 – Runner-up
 – Third place
 – Other finalist
 – Withdrew

Future appearances
Hua Chenyu would appear as a contestant on the eighth season in 2020.

Results

Competition details

First round

Qualifying 
Taping Date: January 3, 2018
Airdate: January 12, 2018

  a. Ranked first in the Pre-Audience Voting
  b. GAI's performance was edited out from the episode re-runs and in video-sharing websites, due to his withdrawal.

Knockout 
Taping Date: January 11, 2018
Airdate: January 19, 2018
The first challenger of the season was Juno Su. Due to Beijing's sudden ban on hip-hop culture, GAI withdraw from the competition; footage on GAI's performances from both episodes (and re-runs) were edited out, and clips of his involvement in the competition were also subsequently removed from video-sharing websites as well. His appearance was neither mentioned nor shown in the later episodes, thus effectively confirming his withdrawal from the competition. 

  a. Ranked first in the Pre-Audience Voting

Overall ranking

  a. As GAI withdrew from the competition before the airing of the first knockout round, his results were not publicly announced; his votes were not removed from the count, and instead calculated based on the votes given to other singers.

Challenge
Taping Date: January 18, 2018
Airdate: January 28, 2018
The first substitute singer of the season was James Li. Normally Su was required to place in top four in a combination of both Knockout and Challenge rounds to be declared safe; however, due to GAI's withdrawal from last week, only the scores from the Challenge round determined the outcome alone. 

  a. Ranked first in the Pre-Audience Voting

Total percentages of votes

Second round

Qualifying
Taping Date: January 25, 2018
Airdate: February 2, 2018
The second substitute singer of the season was Hua Chenyu. 

  a. Ranked first in the Pre-Audience Voting

Knockout
Taping Date: February 1, 2018
Airdate: February 9, 2018
The second challenger of the season was KZ Tandingan. 

  a. Ranked first in the Pre-Audience Voting

Overall ranking

Challenge
Taping Date: February 9, 2018
Airdate: February 16, 2018

  a. Ranked first in the Pre-Audience Voting

Overall ranking

Third round

First Show
Taping Date: February 10, 2018
Airdate: February 23, 2018
The third substitute singer of the season was Tengger. For this week, the results for this round was void due to Jessie J's illness on the following week (See Qualifiers below).

  a. Ranked first in the Pre-Audience Voting

Qualifying
Taping Date: February 28, 2018
Airdate: March 9, 2018
The final challenger of the season was Henry Huo; Huo came in fourth and was temporarily declared safe. Normally, this round would have featured elimination; however, eliminations were cancelled as Jessie J was too ill to perform during rehearsal; Jessie would have perform "My Heart Will Go On", but actually performed the song the following week.

  a. Ranked first in the Pre-Audience Voting

Knockout/Challenge
Taping Date: March 7, 2018
Airdate: March 16, 2018
As Jessie J was able to return after being absent in the previous week, this week featured a double elimination (any two singers with the two lowest votes, or one if Huo fails the Challenge). Tandingan and Hua were initially going to perform 1st and 3rd, respectively, but both orders were swapped on mutual agreement after Tandingan not wished to perform first after doing so on last week and Hua volunteered in taking her place.

  a. Ranked first in the Pre-Audience Voting

Overall ranking

  a. Jessie J's score for that round was zero (and was ranked 8th) as a result of her absence on the Qualifying rounds.
  b. Has a gap of 45 votes between the top five singers, with a difference of four votes cast between the 4th and 5th place singer.

Fourth round

Qualifying
Taping Date: March 15, 2018
Airdate: March 23, 2018 
Yisa Yu was the final substitute singer of the season. 

  a. Ranked first in the Pre-Audience Voting

Knockout
Taping Date: March 22, 2018
Airdate: March 30, 2018

  a. Ranked first in the Pre-Audience Voting

Overall ranking

Breakout
Taping Date: March 30, 2018
Airdate: April 6, 2018  
Three of the six singers who were initial singers (Chang, Jessie J and Wang) were exempt for this round, while the other three singers would participate along with previously eliminated singers (except for GAI) for a chance to enter the finals. The performance order were determined through the contestant's status quo and their duration on the stage, with the three remaining non-initial singers (Hua, Huo, and Tengger), as well as James Li (by-virtue on performing the longest (seven shows) among other singers) chose the performance order, while remaining singers drew their lots to decide the order; the order for the first four performers with a white-colored envelope are told not to open it until the start of the episode- Tien and Yu drew the gold-colored envelopes and were given their orders as fifth and sixth, respectively.

For the first time in the show's history, interim eliminations occur during the Pre-Audience Voting: midway through the fourth and seventh performance, the 500-members cast one vote to save a singer- the singer receiving the fewest votes after each round of the Pre-Audience Voting will be eliminated immediately (breakout failure).

The singers sang one song, and the four singers (of the remaining eight) having the most votes qualified for the finals. Hua, James Li, Tengger & Huo were the top four singers who received the highest number of votes and advanced to the finals.

  a. Eliminated midway for finishing last during Pre-Audience Voting.

Total percentages of votes

  a. The percentage counting towards the total votes does not include votes cast from Xiaodong and Lee, who were the first and second singers, respectively, to be eliminated during the Pre-Audience Voting.

Finals
Airdate: April 13, 2018
The finals were divided into two rounds, with the first song being a duet with a guest singer, and the second song being a solo encore performance. Similar to the previous season, votes cast were the sole determinant of the season's winner.

Round 1
The first round of the finals was a guest singer's duet. The grouping was decided by the singers starting with the most wins prior to the Breakouts (if there is a tie in terms of wins, a prior online vote serves as a tiebreak); each group can consist of either two or three members, meaning that two groups will be head-to-head and one being a three-way. After the groups are decided, one member drew lots to decide the order of performance for this round. The result of the grouping are reflected in the table below.

The singer with the highest number of votes on each group directly advanced to Round 2, leaving four singers eligible for the save through a re-vote; the singer receiving the highest number of votes cast will be saved and also advance to the second round.

Had Henry Huo, Angela Zhang and James Li advanced to the next round, they would've performed "被遺忘的時光", "Faded" and "再見憂傷" as their encore songs, respectively.

Round 2
The second round of the finals is an encore song, and the singer receiving the highest number of votes (this vote was separate from the Round 1 vote) was crowned as the winner. The order for this round was determined by ballot, except for Tengger who would perform first for being the last to advance to Round 2.

Winner of Battle
Jessie J was declared the winner of Singer 2018 with 47.49% of the votes cast, leading by a 21.84% margin ahead of runner-up Hua. Prior to the announcement, it was revealed that Hua's performance from week four ("齊天") won the "Most Popular Song" of the season.

Biennial Concert
Airdate: April 20, 2018
The concert features 11 singers, which include singers from the last season Dimash Kudaibergen, Lion, Tia Ray and Diamond Zhang, as well as all of the seven finalists (Angela Zhang, Hua Chenyu, Henry Huo, Jessie J, James Li, Tengger and Wang Feng).

Ratings 

|-
| 1
| 
| 1.241
| 4.19
| 2
| 0.9
| 3.06
| 1
|-
| 2
| 
| 1.063
| 3.45
| 2
| 0.9
| 2.95
| 1
|-
| 3
| 
| 1.196
| 3.79
| 2
| 1.0
| 3.26
| 1
|-
| 4
| 
| 1.063
| 3.47
| 3
| 1.09
| 3.57
| 1
|-
| 5
| 
| 1.186
| 3.90
| 2
| 1.11
| 3.64
| 1
|-
| 6
| 
| 0.744
| 4.32
| 9
| 0.62
| 4.01
| 1
|-
| 7
| 
| 1.027
| 3.33
| 3
| 0.98
| 3.3
| 1
|- style="background:#D3D3D3;"
| 
| 
| colspan=6 | 
|-
| 8
| 
| 1.148
| 3.87
| 2
| 0.93
| 3.02
| 1
|-
| 9
| 
| 0.894
| 2.96
| 4
| 0.77
| 2.59
| 2
|-
| 10
| 
| 0.883
| 3.05
| 5
| 0.73
| 2.57
| 2
|-
| 11
| 
| 0.874
| 3.01
| 5
| 0.75
| 2.59
| 2
|-
| 12
| 
| 0.842
| 2.81
| 5
| 0.78
| 2.64
| 2
|-
| 13
| 
| 1.264
| 4.47
| 3
| 0.75
| 2.75
| 2
|-
| 14
| 
| 0.699
| 2.47
| 4
| 0.68
| 2.43
| 2

Notes

References

External links
 

Singer (TV series)
2018 in Chinese music